Saad is a common male Arabic given name which means 'friend / companion'. The name stems from the Arabic verb  ( 'to be happy, fortunate or lucky'). 

Saad is the stem of variant given names Suad and Sa‘id.

It may be a shortened version of Sa'd al-Din, and is not to be confused with it. It is not the same as the single Arabic letter ṣād, which has no intrinsic meaning.

It may refer to:

Tribal Name
Banu Sa'd, a Saudi tribe

First name
Saad Albazei, Saudi Arabian intellectual 
Saad Shaddad Al-Asmari, Saudi Arabian runner 
Saad Awad, American mixed martial artist of Palestinian descent
Saad Benyamin, Iraqi international football (soccer) player
Saad Eskander, Iraqi-Kurdish academic and researcher 
Saad Kamil Al-Fadhli, Kuwaiti football referee
Sa'ad Al-Faqih, Saudi dissident
Saad Haddad, Lebanese military personnel
Saad Hafeez, Danish cricketer
Saad Hariri, Lebanese politician, former Prime Minister of Lebanon
Saad Haroon, Pakistani comedian
Saad Al-Harthi, Saudi Arabian footballer
Saad Hamdan, Lebanese actor and voice actor
Saad Hayel Srour, Jordanian politician
Saad Ichalalène, Algerian football (soccer) player
Saad Janjua, Singaporean-Pakistani cricketer
Saad Khader, Saudi Arabian television actor, director and producer
Sa'ad Khair, Jordanian Intelligence and security official
Saad Khan, Indian film director, screenwriter and acting teacher
Saad Lamjarred, Moroccan pop singer-songwriter, actor and record producer
Saad Mamoun, Egyptian military commander 
Saad Madhi Saad Howash Al Azmi, Kuwaiti detainee in Guantanamo
Saad Mohseni, Afghani-Australian businessman
Saʿd ibn Muaʿdh, an Arabian tribal leader and an early convert to Islam
Saad Al-Abdullah Al-Salim Al-Sabah, former Emir of Kuwait
Saad Salman, Iraqi-French film director
Sa'ad bin Abdul Rahman Al Saud, Saudi royal
Saad bin Abdulaziz Al Saud, Saudi royal
Saad bin Faisal Al Saud, Saudi royal
Saad bin Saud Al Saud, Saudi royal 
Saad Al-Shammari, Qatari footballer
Saad el-Shazly, Egyptian military personality
Saad Tedjar, Algerian football (soccer) player
Saad Bin Tefla, Kuwaiti businessman and politician
Sa'd ibn Ubadah, an Arabian tribal leader and an early convert to Islam
Sa`d ibn Abi Waqqas, a companion of Prophet Muhammad
Saad Bin Zafar, Pakistan-Canadian cricket player
Saad Zaghloul, Egyptian Prime Minister and anti-imperialist leader

Middle name
Mohammad Ibn Sa'd al-Baghdadi, aka Ibn Sa'd, often called Katib ul-Waqidi, the scribe of Waqidi 
Yusuf Saad Kamel, a Kenyan-born Bahraini professional athlete (runner)
Abdul Aziz Sa'ad Al-Khaldi, Saudi Arabian detainee in Guantanamo
Bilal Saad Mubarak, Qatari sportsman (shot putter) 
Khalid Saad Mohammed, Saudi Arabian detainee in Guantanamo 
Matthew Saad Muhammad (born Maxwell Antonio Loach), American former boxer
Salman Saad Al Khadi Mohammed, Saudi Arabian detainee in Guantanamo
Ahmed Saad Osman, Libyan football player
Khawaja Saad Rafique, Pakistani politician

Family name
Abbas Saad, Australian former international football (soccer) player of Lebanese origin
Abdulrahman Mohamed Saad, Qatari basketball player
Adam Saad Australian rules footballer
Ahmed Saad (Australian footballer), Australian rules football player of Egyptian descent
Baba Saad, or just Saad, a German rapper of Lebanese origin
Brandon Saad, American ice hockey player of Syrian origin
Emmanuel Saad, Egyptian Coptic composer, music arranger
Emir Saad, real name Alan Digorsky, Ossetian Islamist militant and the first leader of the Ossetian Jamaat Kataib al-Khoul 
Ezzat Saad, Egyptian diplomat 
Gad Saad, Jewish-Canadian behavioural scientist and university professor 
Felipe Saad, Brazilian football (soccer) player
Ghanim Bin Saad Al Saad, Qatari businessman
Habib Pacha Es-Saad, Lebanese politician and former Prime Minister
Halim Saad, a Malaysian businessman 
Hasballah M. Saad, Indonesian politician
Henry Saad, American Michigan-based judge 
John Saad, Sierra Leonean politician of Lebanese descent
Khaled Saad, Jordanian football (soccer) player 
Mahmoud Saad (footballer, born 1952), Egyptian football (soccer) player
Mahmoud Saad (footballer, born 1983), Egyptian football (soccer) player
Malik Saad, Pakistani senior police officer, engineer
Matías Saad, Argentine professional football (soccer) player
Margit Saad, German film and television actress
Mohamed Saad (disambiguation)
Naeem Saad, Kuwaiti football (soccer) player 
Natasja Saad, late Danish rapper
Nicolás Saad, Argentinean film director
 Osama Saad (born 1954), Lebanese politician
Razali Saad, Singaporean football (soccer) player
Roberto Saad, former Argentinean professional tennis player
Rola Saad, Lebanese pop singer and model
Rola Saad (entertainer), Lebanese pan-Arab television personality, producing well-known television shows including the Arab version of Star Academy 
Salem Saad, Emirati football (soccer) player
Shahrizal Saad, Malaysian football (soccer) player
Siti binti Saad, Tanzanian taraab artist
Soony Saad, Arab-American soccer player
Stephen Saad (born 1964), South African businessman
Syamsul Saad, Malaysian football (soccer) player 
Waseelah Saad, Yemeni track and field sprint athlete 
Yousef Saad, American computer scientist of Algerian origin

See also
Saad (disambiguation)
Saado
Saadallah, disambiguation
Sa'd al-Din / Saad Eddin (disambiguation)

Arabic masculine given names